The Carl Sagan Medal for Excellence in Public Communication in Planetary Science is an award established by the Division for Planetary Sciences of the American Astronomical Society to recognize and honor outstanding communication by an active planetary scientist to the general public. It is awarded to scientists whose efforts have significantly contributed to a public understanding of, and enthusiasm for planetary science.

Carl Sagan Medal winners

See also

 List of astronomy awards

References

Astronomy prizes
Carl Sagan